José Cedeño may refer to:

José Antonio Cedeño (born 1939), Cuban artist
José Dimas Cedeño Delgado (born 1933), Panamanian Roman Catholic archbishop